USS Gambier Bay (CVE-73) was a  of the United States Navy. She was sunk in the Battle off Samar during the Battle of Leyte Gulf after helping to turn back a much larger attacking Japanese surface force. She was the only American aircraft carrier sunk by enemy surface gunfire during World War II.

Named for Gambier Bay on Admiralty Island in the Alaska Panhandle, she was originally classified AVG-73, was reclassified ACV-73 on 20 August 1942 and again reclassified CVE-73 on 15 July 1943; launched under a Maritime Commission contract by the Kaiser Shipbuilding Company, Vancouver, Washington on 22 November 1943; sponsored by Mrs. H. C. Zitzewitz, wife of Lieutenant Commander Herbert C. Zitzewitz, the Senior Naval Liaison Officer (SNLO) assigned to Kaiser's Vancouver Yard from the Navy's Bureau of Ships; and commissioned at Astoria, Oregon on 28 December 1943, Captain Hugh H. Goodwin in command.

The ship was referred to as the "Bonus Ship" by yard personnel because she was the 19th carrier delivered in 1943. The yard had originally projected 16 carriers would be delivered before the end of 1943. However, in September the Navy asked the yard to increase that number by at least two more. To rally the workers, Kaiser initiated a campaign called "18 or More by '44" to meet the new challenge; being the 19th and last Kaiser-built carrier commissioned in 1943, Gambier Bay was dubbed the "Bonus Ship". No ships of her class survive today.

Service history

World War II

After shakedown out of San Diego, the escort carrier sailed on 7 February 1944 with 400 troops embarked for Pearl Harbor, thence to rendezvous off the Marshalls, guarded by the destroyer , where she flew 84 replacement planes to the fleet carrier . She returned to San Diego via Pearl Harbor, ferrying aircraft for repairs and qualified carrier pilots off the coast of Southern California. She departed on 1 May 1944 to join Rear Admiral Harold B. Sallada's Carrier Support Group 2 (TG 52.11), staging in the Marshalls for the invasion of the Marianas.

Gambier Bay gave close air support to the initial landings of Marines on Saipan 15 June 1944, destroying enemy gun emplacements, troops, tanks, and trucks. On the 17th, her combat air patrol (CAP) shot down or turned back all but a handful of 47 enemy planes headed for her task group and her gunners shot down two of the three planes that did break through to attack her.

The following day, warning of another air attack sounded. As her fighters prepared to take off, they found intense antiaircraft fire of the entire task group covering their flight path. Captain Goodwin called the event "another shining example of the adaptability and courage of the young men of our country". Eight pilots of Composite Squadron 10 (VC-10) did take off to help repulse the aerial attack.

Gambier Bay remained off Saipan, repulsing aerial raids and launching planes which strafed enemy troop concentrations, bombed gun emplacements, and supported Marines and soldiers fighting ashore. Meanwhile, American carriers slashed the carrier air strength of the combined Japanese Mobile Fleet and turned it back in defeat in the Battle of the Philippine Sea. Gambier Bay continued close ground support operations at Tinian (19–31 July), then turned her attention to Guam, where she gave identical aid to invading troops until 11 August.

After a respite for logistics in the Marshalls, Gambier Bay spent 15–28 September supporting the amphibious attack which drove ashore and captured Peleliu and Angaur, Southern Palaus. She then steamed by way of Hollandia (currently known as Jayapura), New Guinea, to Manus Island, Admiralties, where the invasion of the Philippines was staged. Screened by four destroyer escorts, Gambier Bay and her sister ship  escorted transports and amphibious landing ships safely to Leyte Gulf before joining Rear Admiral Clifton A. F. Sprague's escort carrier task unit on 19 September off Leyte.

The task unit comprised six escort carriers, screened by three destroyers and four destroyer escorts, and was known by its radio call sign: "Taffy 3". Under the command of Rear Admiral Thomas L. Sprague, three groups of six-carrier task units, known as "Taffy"s, maintained air supremacy over Leyte Gulf and eastern Leyte. During the invasion their planes destroyed enemy airfields, supply convoys, and troop concentrations; gave troops driving inland vital close air support; and maintained combat air patrol over ships in Leyte Gulf. While "Taffy 1" and "Taffy 2" were respectively stationed off northern Mindanao and off the entrance to Leyte Gulf, "Taffy 3" steamed off Samar.

Meanwhile, the Japanese threw their entire fleet against American naval power in a desperate gamble to destroy the large concentration of American shipping in Leyte Gulf. Powerful Japanese forces—composed of carriers, battleships, cruisers, and destroyers—attempted to converge on the Philippines in a three-pronged attack to the south, center, and north. The Japanese Southern Force met disaster before dawn on 25 October as it tried to drive through Surigao Strait to join the Center Force off Leyte Gulf. While steaming through the Sibuyan Sea en route to the San Bernardino Strait on 24 October, the Center Force was hit hard by hundreds of planes from the carriers of Admiral William "Bull" Halsey's Third Fleet. After the Battle of Sibuyan Sea, Admiral Halsey no longer considered the Center Force a serious threat, and he sent the carriers north to intercept decoy carriers of the Japanese Northern Force off Cape Engaño.

Battle off Samar

The departure of Halsey's carriers left the escort carriers of "Taffy 3" as the only ships guarding the area around Samar. American commanders were unaware of night-time movement of the Japanese Center Force toward Samar. However, shortly after sunrise on 25 October, a gap in the morning mist disclosed the pagoda-like masts of enemy battleships and cruisers on the northern horizon. The still dangerous Center Force—consisting of four battleships, six heavy cruisers, two light cruisers and 11 destroyers—had slipped undetected through San Bernardino Strait and down the fog-shrouded coast of Samar, bound for Leyte Gulf.

"Taffy 3" was overwhelmingly outgunned by the Center Force. Immediately, an urgent call for help went out from "Taffy 3" as the escort carriers steamed eastward to launch planes before gradually turning south to seek concealment in a heavy squall. American pilots attacked the Japanese formation with torpedoes, bombs, and strafing runs until their ammunition ran out, after which they made "dry runs"—dummy attacks with no ordnance or ammunition—to break up the enemy formation and delay its advance. Smoke was laid down to cover the escort carriers' escape as the destroyers ducked in and out of the smoke and rain to engage the Japanese warships at point-blank range until ordered back to cover the escort carriers with more smoke. In spite of these efforts, Gambier Bay was fired on and hit by multiple Japanese ships. Gambier Bays lone  gun fired at an enemy cruiser that was shelling her, and the destroyers  and  made an unsuccessful effort to save her.

Around 08:20, Gambier Bay was severely damaged by a shell hit which flooded her forward engine room, cutting her speed in half. Gambier Bay was soon dead in the water as the heavy cruisers  and  closed to point blank range. Most of her nearly 800 survivors were rescued two days later by landing and patrol craft dispatched from Leyte Gulf. Sharks killed many drifting crewmembers. 147 crewmen were killed. The Americans also lost four other ships in the battle—, and Johnston. Gambier Bay was the only US Navy aircraft carrier sunk exclusively by surface naval gunfire during World War II.

Aircraft from "Taffy 2" joined in the battle off Samar. The events that followed were described by Admiral Sprague:

"At 09:25 my mind was occupied with dodging torpedoes when near the bridge I heard one of the signalmen yell 'They're getting away!' I could hardly believe my eyes, but it looked as if the whole Japanese fleet was indeed retiring. However, it took a whole series of reports from circling planes to convince me. And still I could not get the fact to soak into my battle-numbed brain. At best, I had expected to be swimming by this time."

Gambier Bays VC-10 Squadron and other ships of "Taffy 3"—aided by planes of "Taffy 2"—had stopped the powerful Japanese Center Force and inflicted significant losses. Three enemy cruisers were sunk, and much damage was inflicted on the other ships. Overall, the overwhelmingly powerful Japanese surface fleet had been turned back by the escort carriers and their screen of destroyers and destroyer escorts.

Awards
Gambier Bay received four battle stars for service in World War II and shared in the award of the Presidential Unit Citation to "Taffy 3" for extraordinary heroism in the Battle off Samar. Commanding officer Captain Walter V. R. Vieweg received the Navy Cross for his "extraordinary heroism". Executive officer Richard R. Ballinger received the Silver Star "for conscious gallantry and intrepidity".

See also
 List of U.S. Navy losses in World War II

References

Further reading

External links

 USS Gambier Bay (CVE-73) & Composite Squadron VC-10 official website
 USS Gambier Bay (CVE-73) & Composite Squadron VC-10 association website
 NavSource Online: Escort Carrier Photo Archive USS Gambier Bay (CVE-73)
 The Ship Has Sunk and the Sharks are Hungry — the account of survivor Earl Bagley
 

 

Casablanca-class escort carriers
World War II escort aircraft carriers of the United States
Ships built in Vancouver, Washington
World War II shipwrecks in the Philippine Sea
1943 ships
Maritime incidents in October 1944
S4-S2-BB3 ships